José Simeón Luján (born March 19, 1991) is a Spanish basketball player, who plays the point guard position. He's currently playing for the Spanish club Hispagan UPB Gandia. He played Valencia BC youth system between 2002 and 2009.

Awards and accomplishments

Club honours
Eurocup (1):
 2009–10
LEB Catalan League (2):
2011, 2012

Spanish national team
2010 FIBA Europe Under-20 Championship: 
2011 FIBA Europe Under-20 Championship:

External links
 ACB profile
 FEB profile

1991 births
Living people
Força Lleida CE players
Liga ACB players
Spanish men's basketball players
Valencia Basket players
Point guards